A bipolar nebula is a type of nebula characterized by two lobes either side of a central star. About 10-20% of planetary nebulae are bipolar.

Formation
Though the exact causes of this nebular structure are not known, it is often thought to imply the presence of a binary central star with a period of a few days to a few years. As one of the two stars expelled its outer layers, the other disrupted the outflow of material to form the bipolar shape.

Examples

 Homunculus Nebula around Eta Carinae
 Hubble 5
 M2-9 – The Wings of a Butterfly Nebula
 OH231.8+4.2 – The Calabash Nebula or Rotten Egg Nebula
 Mz3 (or Menzel 3) – The Ant Nebula
 CRL 618 - The Westbrook Nebula
 CRL 2688 – The Egg Nebula
 HD 44179 – The Red Rectangle Nebula
 MyCn18 – The Engraved Hourglass Nebula
  – The Southern Crab Nebula
 The Boomerang Nebula
 NGC 2346 – Also known as the Butterfly Nebula
 NGC 6302 – The Bug or Butterfly Nebula
 KjPn 8 Nebula – The largest (in angular size) bipolar planetary nebula.

References

See also
 Bipolar outflow
 Stellar evolution

Nebulae